The Linux Userland Filesystem (LUFS) is a File System on Linux, which is similar to FUSE in that a file system driver provides a bridge from kernel mode to user mode. With LUFS it is possible, among other things, to mount remote directories via SSH, FTP or Gnutella. As with FUSE, an LUFS filesystem can be developed with little effort comparable with a normal application. With the addition of FUSE in the Linux kernel LUFS has lost its relevance and is no longer being developed. Filesystems developed using LUFS can be used on FUSE with a translator layer called .

External links 
 Linux Userland File System on SourceForge (English)

File systems supported by the Linux kernel